Frances White may refer to:

Frances Emily White (1832–1903), American anatomist and physiologist
Frances White (vaudeville) (1896–1969), American vaudeville performer of song M-I-S-S-I-S-S-I-P-P-I
Frances White (actress) (born 1938), English television and film performer
E. Frances White (born 1949), American historian, author and academic
Frances J. White (born 1958), American biological anthropologist at University of Oregon
Frances White (born 1960), American instrumental, vocal and electronic composer (Mari Kimura#Compositions)

See also
Frances Whyte, Scottish lawn and indoor bowler; gold medalist in 1985
Deborah Frances-White, Australian-British comedy performer; co-founder in 1996 of The Spontaneity Shop 
Francis White (disambiguation)